Ashland is a city in Saunders County, Nebraska, United States. The population was 2,453 at the 2010 census.

History
Ashland is located at the site of a low-water limestone ledge along the bottom of Salt Creek, an otherwise mud-bottomed stream that was a formidable obstacle for wagon trains on the great westward migrations of the late 1840s and 1850s. The Oxbow Trail, a variant route of the Oregon Trail, ran from Nebraska City (on the Missouri River) to Fort Kearny (on the Platte River), where it joined the main route of the Oregon Trail.  The limestone bottom of Salt Creek at Ashland made it an excellent fording site.
Ashland was established in 1870 and named after Ashland, the estate of Henry Clay.

Today, Ashland benefits by its proximity to Interstate 80 and the cities of Omaha and Lincoln.  While in some respects Ashland is becoming a "bedroom community" of those much larger cities, it retains a rural character. That coherence as a community, and a 30-minute drive to either of the state's economic hubs, has led to a building boom in the late 1990s and the 2000s.

Geography
Ashland is located at  (41.040548, -96.372389).

Demographics

2010 census
At the 2010 census there were 2,453 people, 951 households, and 639 families living in the city. The racial makeup of the city was 97.6% White, 0.2% African American, 0.2% Native American, 0.2% Asian, 0.3% from other races, and 1.5% from two or more races. Hispanic or Latino individuals of any race were 2.6%.

Of the 951 households 34.8% had children under the age of 18 living with them, 50.7% were married couples living together, 11.5% had a female householder with no husband present, 5.0% had a male householder with no wife present, and 32.8% were non-families. 26.1% of households were one person and 12.5% were one person aged 65 or older. The average household size was 2.49 and the average family size was 3.00.

The median age was 37 years. 26.1% of residents were under the age of 18; 8.5% were between the ages of 18 and 24; 24.8% were from 25 to 44; 24.7% were from 45 to 64; and 15.9% were 65 or older. The gender makeup of the city was 49.7% male and 50.3% female.

2000 census
At the 2000 census, there were 2,262 people, 877 households, and 591 families living in the city. The population density was 2,130.2 people per square mile (823.9/km). There were 930 housing units at an average density of 875.8 per square mile (338.8/km). The racial makeup of the city was 98.76% White, 0.13% African American, 0.27% Native American, 0.40% Asian, 0.18% from other races, and 0.27% from two or more races. Hispanic or Latino individuals of any race were 1.64% of the population.

Of the 877 households 33.8% had children under the age of 18 living with them, 53.5% were married couples living together, 10.8% had a female householder with no husband present, and 32.6% were non-families. 26.7% of households were one person and 15.4% were one person aged 65 or older. The average household size was 2.47 and the average family size was 3.01.

The age distribution was 25.7% under the age of 18, 7.4% from 18 to 24, 28.3% from 25 to 44, 20.3% from 45 to 64, and 18.2% 65 or older. The median age was 38 years. For every 100 females, there were 88.5 males. For every 100 females age 18 and over, there were 89.0 males.

The median household income was $40,441, and the median family income  was $47,428. Males had a median income of $32,339 versus $21,328 for females. The per capita income for the city was $19,072. About 9.3% of families and 9.5% of the population were below the poverty line, including 13.6% of those under age 18 and 9.6% of those age 65 or over.

Business and industry
Employers in the Ashland area include Innovative Laboratory Systems, Linoma Software, Camp Ashland (Nebraska Army National Guard Training Center), and Trade Well Pallet.

Notable people
Ashland is the hometown of astronaut Clayton Anderson.

Ashland is the hometown of Jeff Raikes, former chief executive officer of the Bill & Melinda Gates Foundation and, until 2008, president of the Microsoft Business Division.

References

 Saunders County History (1983)
 Andreas' History of the State of Nebraska
 Ashland Historical Society

External links

 City of Ashland
 Ashland-Greenwood Public Schools

Cities in Nebraska
Cities in Saunders County, Nebraska
Populated places established in 1870
1870 establishments in Nebraska